Doris montereyensis is a species of sea slug, a dorid nudibranch, a shell-less marine gastropod mollusk in the family Dorididae.

Description
Doris montereyensis is similar in shape and colour to Anisodoris nobilis but instead of the gills being white they are yellow which is the same as the mantle. Dark pigment usually covers the tubercles.

Distribution
This species has been recorded from Alaska to San Diego, California.

References

Dorididae
Gastropods described in 1862
Taxa named by James Graham Cooper